Singin' & Swingin' is a 1960 album by the American jazz singer Betty Roché.

Reception
Scott Yanow reviewed the album for AllMusic and wrote that Roché "should have been much more famous" and that the album was "Recommended, as are all of the other recordings in her slim discography".

Track listing
 "Come Rain or Come Shine" (Harold Arlen, Johnny Mercer) – 3:48
 "A Foggy Day" (George Gershwin, Ira Gershwin) – 3:37
 "Day by Day" (Sammy Cahn, Axel Stordahl, Paul Weston) – 3:55
 "When I Fall in Love" (Edward Heyman, Victor Young) – 3:18
 "Blue Moon" (Lorenz Hart, Richard Rodgers) – 3:01
 "Where or When" (Hart, Rodgers) – 2:56
 "September Song" (Maxwell Anderson, Kurt Weill) – 2:08
 "(It Will Have to Do) Until the Real Thing Comes Along" (Sammy Cahn, Saul Chaplin, L. E. Freeman, Mann Holiner, Alberta Nichols) – 4:10
 "Billie's Bounce" (Charlie Parker) – 3:12

Personnel
Betty Roché – vocals
Jimmy Forrest – tenor saxophone
Jack McDuff – organ
Bill Jennings – guitar
Wendell Marshall – double bass
Roy Haynes – drums
Dale Wright – liner notes
Rudy Van Gelder – engineer
Esmond Edwards – cover art, supervisor
Phil DeLancie – digital remastering

References

1960 albums
Albums recorded at Van Gelder Studio
Betty Roché albums
Prestige Records albums